Neisha is Slovenian singer Neisha's debut album, released in 2005. It is the best-selling album of 2005 in Slovenia and one of the most successful albums in Slovenia ever.

Track listing 
"Slab dan"
"Le kaj se skriva"
""
"Malo tu malo tam"
"Čarobni potep"
"'Maš še kje čas"
"Najlepša pot"
"Vsako popoldne"
"The game U play"
"Movin' on"
"The people we are"

Bonus tracks 
"2 bad 2 sad" (demo recording)
"Straight to the moon" (English version of )
"Miles away" (English version of Malo tu malo tam)

Special 2CD release 
The special versions includes a second disc with live recordings from a concert at the Cankar Centre.

"Le kaj se skriva" (live)
"Čarobni potep" (live)
"'Maš še kje čas" (live)
"Ne daj da gledam u nebo" (live, not featured on studio version)
"Get up" (live, not featured on studio version)
"Malo tu malo tam" (live)

Additional tracks 
"" (unplugged)
"Njen trenutek prihaja" (duet with Vlado Kreslin, not featured on studio version)

External links 
 Neisha's official website

2005 albums
Neisha albums